The 1979–80 Galatama was the inaugural season of the Indonesian Galatama football competition since its establishment in 1979. The season was played from 17 March 1979 to 6 May 1980 and Warna Agung won the championship.

Teams 
The first edition of Galatama was contested by 14 teams.

Bandung
 Sari Bumi Raya
Bogor
 Perkesa '78
Magelang
 Tidar Sakti
Medan
 Pardedetex
Surabaya
 NIAC Mitra
Tanjungkarang
 Jaka Utama
Jakarta
 Arseto
 BBSA Tama
 Buana Putra
 Cahaya Kita
 Indonesia Muda
 Jayakarta
 Tunas Inti
 Warna Agung

League table

References

External links
list of Galatama champions

Indo
1
Galatama
Top level Indonesian football league seasons